Vincent Anthony Ragosta (February 12, 1924 – August 9, 2017) was an American lawyer and jurist from Rhode Island. He was a former Rhode Island Superior Court justice.

Biography

Early life, education & military service
Ragosta was born in Providence, Rhode Island in 1924. He attended the University of Rhode Island before being drafted into the United States Army during World War II and was stationed in Okinawa, in preparation to invade Japan, until the United States dropped the atomic bombs on Nagasaki and Hiroshima in 1945. He was honorably discharged as a staff sergeant and continued to graduate from the University of Rhode Island in 1949. In 1951, he graduated from Boston College Law School, earning his Juris Doctor. He was a recipient of the Polygon Prize and was elected into the national honorary societies of Phi Kappa Phi and Beta Gamma Sigma. He also attended Johns Hopkins University and The Citadel.

Career
Ragosta worked as an assistant city solicitor in the city of Providence from 1953 until 1966. He had a very successful law practice in Providence for 27 years. He also served on the state Family Violence Unit Advisory Panel (which was part of the office of the Rhode Island Attorney General) and on the state Advisory Council on Social Welfare.

In 1978, he was appointed to the state District Court by then-governor J. Joseph Garrahy. In 1988, he was appointed to the state Superior Court by then-Governor Edward D. DiPrete and later retired from the bench in June 2008. At the time of his retirement, he was the oldest judge in the state of Rhode Island.

Marriage and children
Ragosta was married and had four sons. He died on August 9, 2017, at the age of 93.

Honorary Awards
In 1975 he was awarded the Star of Italian Solidarity with the rank of Knight by the President of Italy Giovanni Leone.

References

External links

1924 births
2017 deaths
20th-century American lawyers
21st-century American lawyers
20th-century American judges
21st-century American judges
United States Army personnel of World War II
Boston College Law School alumni
Rhode Island state court judges
University of Rhode Island alumni
Lawyers from Providence, Rhode Island
People from Providence, Rhode Island
United States Army soldiers